William Francis Roy (9 December 1924 – 23 March 1991) was an Australian whistleblower who worked as the Principal Technical Officer at Telecom Tower, and alleged the existence of a secret surveillance center in the tower in an unaired 1991 interview with Jana Wendt. He later died in hospital following a suspicious bicycle crash.

Roy began his career as part of the Royal Australian Air Force during World War II, enlisting shortly after his 18th birthday in 1943. Following his discharge in 1946, Roy became a staunch communist, and activist gaining him the attention of ASIO. By the time he died they had collected a 36-page report on him. He later joined the Australian Labor Party in a tactical move to gain a promotion.

1991 interview 
In 1991 Roy gave an interview to Jana Wendt, where, according to his daughter he discussed the existence of a secret surveillance centre within the tower that was part of the surveillance program later revealed to be ECHELON. A short excerpt of the interview was aired as a preview of the upcoming report, however before the full interview could air a D-Notice was placed on it, barring it from broadcast. A D-notice was a communication issued to the media by the Defence, Press and Broadcasting Committee. It outlined subjects which bear upon defence or national security, and requested editors to refrain from publishing certain information about those subjects.

Multiple times over the year previous to the interview Roy had attempted to contact media regarding the issue, however nothing had come of it.

Death 
After Roy's interview, he became increasingly fearful that he was in danger, voicing his concerns to his family. In late 1990 Roy had had an incident with his bicycle where a heavy object had been thrown at the wheel, damaging it and injuring Roy. The same year Roy was admitted to the Royal Canberra Hospital for Nephrotic syndrome, where a biopsy of his kidneys revealed the presence of "flocculent material", an unusual symptom pointing to the possibility that he was poisoned.

The next year, on 20 March 1991, Roy suffered an ultimately fatal head wound while riding home at dusk towards the bridge over Sullivans Creek on the ANU campus. It was reported that the location was dimly lit, although his bike had a headlight that was still on even after the incident. The lights along the pathway had been turned off shortly prior to the incident, alerting a security guard. Roy was found unconscious next to his bike after apparently hitting a bollard and falling off. According to the later police report, the bike "had sustained very minor damages". Bloodstains were discovered over two meters away.

Roy was rushed to the Royal Canberra Hospital where he was placed on life support. He was suffering from serious brain swelling, although a doctor stated on his patient notes that he "does not meet the criteria for brain death". Despite this Roy was taken off life support the next day, in contradiction to the hospital's policies on head-trauma injuries.

In 1997 Roy's daughter contacted 60 Minutes about the possibility of a piece about her father, however after several days of interviews and investigation she was informed that there was a D-Notice on any media regarding Roy's death.

References 

1924 births
1991 deaths
Crime in the Australian Capital Territory
People from Wollongong
Australian communists
Royal Australian Air Force personnel of World War II